Lieutenant General Paul Wilkins Kendall (July 17, 1898 – October 3, 1983) was a senior United States Army officer who served during World War I, World War II and Korean War.

Early life and military career

Kendall was born on July 17, 1898, in Baldwin City, Kansas, and raised in Sheridan, Wyoming. In 1916, during World War I (although the American entry into World War I did not occur until April 1917), he obtained an appointment to the United States Military Academy (USMA) at West Point, New York, from which he graduated in November 1918, receiving his commission as a second lieutenant into the Infantry Branch of the United States Army. By the time he graduated, the war had come to an end with the signing of the Armistice.

Siberian Campaign
Kendall attended the Infantry School of Arms at Fort Benning, Georgia, from late 1918 to early 1919.

After completing his training, he was assigned to the 27th Infantry Regiment during the Siberian Campaign.  Kendall participated in an action on January 10, 1920, for which he received the Distinguished Service Cross.

Post-Siberian Campaign
Kendall carried out a variety of assignments in the 1920s and '30s, including a posting to Fort Logan, Colorado with the 38th Infantry Regiment in 1923 and served as an Instructor in the Department of English and History at the United States Military Academy from 1925 to 1930 and later at Northwestern Military and Naval Academy. Kendall also performed duty in China, Hawaii and the Philippines.

In 1936, Kendall graduated from the Command & General Staff College.  In the early 1940s, he served in a staff assignment at the Office of the Chief of Staff in Washington, D.C.

World War II
At the start of World War II, Kendall was assigned as Chief of Staff of the 85th Infantry Division.  He then served as Assistant Division Commander of the 84th Infantry Division, receiving a promotion to brigadier general.

From September 1944 to July 1945, Kendall was commander of the "Blue Devils" of the 88th Infantry Division and was promoted to major general.  The division's second World War II commander, he led it during its assault through Italy, including the capture of Vicenza and Verona.

During the war, Kendall received the Silver Star for heroism on three occasions, two in 1944 and one in 1945.

Post-World War II
From June 1946 to May 1948, Kendall was commander of the 2nd Infantry Division.  In 1951, Kendall was assigned to occupation duty in Austria as commander of the American Zone. He was in that position until 1952, then he returned to the United States for a short assignment as commander of VI Corps at Camp Atterbury, Indiana.

Korean War

In June 1952, Kendall became commander of I Corps, receiving promotion to lieutenant general.  He led the corps as it manned a defensive line until the end of 1952.  In January 1953, the corps took part in an offensive with troops of the 1st Republic of Korea (ROK) Division, attacking the enemy at Big Nori.  Beginning in March, the North Koreans and Chinese continually attacked I Corps positions, and I Corps began a phased withdrawal that resulted in numerous enemy casualties.  Kendall turned command of I Corps over to Bruce C. Clarke in April 1953.

Post-Korean War
After leaving I Corps, Kendall was assigned as Deputy Commanding General, US Army Forces Far East, in Manila, Philippines.

In 1954, Kendall was assigned as commander of Allied Land Forces Southeastern Europe in Izmir, Turkey, where he served until his 1955 retirement.

Personal life
General Kendall was married to Ruth Child Pistole (November 10, 1900 – January 29, 1985).  They had two daughters, Jean and Elizabeth.  Jean was the wife of Navy officer Neal D. Baumgardner and Elizabeth was the wife of Army officer Raymond O. Miller.

Retirement and death
Kendall retired to Palo Alto, California, where he died on October 3, 1983.  He was buried at West Point Cemetery.

Citation for Distinguished Service Cross
The official U.S. Army citation for Kendall's Distinguished Service Cross reads:

General Orders: War Department, General Orders No. 35 (1920)
Action Date: January 10, 1920
Name: Paul Wilkins Kendall
Service: Army
Rank: Second Lieutenant
Regiment: 27th Infantry
Division: American Expeditionary Forces (Siberia)
Citation: The President of the United States of America, authorized by Act of Congress, July 9, 1918, takes pleasure in presenting the Distinguished Service Cross to Second Lieutenant (Infantry) Paul W. Kendall, United States Army, for extraordinary heroism while serving with 27th Infantry, 33d Division, A.E.F. (Siberia), in action at Posolskaya, Siberia, 10 January 1920. Lieutenant Kendall was in command of a detachment of his company when attacked by an armored train at 1 a.m. The detachment under his leadership and inspired by his example attacked and disabled the armored train and caused its surrender.

Ribbon bar

Here is his ribbon bar:

References

External links
 Biographical Register of the Officers and Graduates of the U.S Military Academy, by George Washington Cullum, 1920, Volume VI B, page 2052
 Russian Sideshow: America's Undeclared War, 1918–1920, by Robert L. Willett, 2003
 U.S. Army Recruiting News, published by the U.S. Army Adjutant General, 1923
 Annual Report of the Superintendent, United States Military Academy, 1925, page 27
 Official Army List and Directory, published by the U.S. Army Adjutant General, 1931
 Official Army List and Directory, published by the U.S. Army Adjutant General, 1941
 Draftee Division: the 88th Infantry Division in World War II, by John Sloan Brown, 1986
 Blue Devils, the 88th Infantry Division and Mt. Mestas Research Web Site
 Combat Chronicle, 2nd Infantry Division, United States Army Center of Military History
 The Korean War: a Historical Dictionary, by Paul M. Edwards, 2003 page 297
 Newspaper article, Gen. Kendall Sent to Frankfort, New York Times, March 9, 1948
 Official Army List and Directory, published by the U.S. Army Adjutant General, Volume 1, 1949
 Newspaper article, Gen. Kendall Takes Over 1st Corps in Korea, Chicago Tribune, June 30, 1952
 Official Army List and Directory, published by the U.S. Army Adjutant General, Volume 1, 1954
 Newspaper article, Kendall Commands, Hartford Courant, January 9, 1954
 Newspaper article, Gen. Kendall Promoted, Hartford Courant, September 19, 1952
 Newspaper article, Allied Land Forces Commander Named, Modesto Bee, July 5, 1955
 Military News in San Francisco Daily Newspapers, by Robert Walter Gibson, 1956, page 28
 Register of graduates and former cadets of the United States Military Academy, published by U.S.M.A. Alumni Association, 1971, page 354
 Military Times, Hall of Heroes, Distinguished Service Cross Citation, Paul W. Kendall
Generals of World War II

|-

1898 births
1983 deaths
People from Baldwin City, Kansas
People from Sheridan, Wyoming
United States Military Academy alumni
American military personnel of the Russian Civil War
Recipients of the Distinguished Service Cross (United States)
United States Army Command and General Staff College alumni
United States Military Academy faculty
Recipients of the Silver Star
United States Army personnel of the Korean War
Recipients of the Legion of Merit
Recipients of the Distinguished Service Medal (US Army)
Recipients of the Czechoslovak War Cross
People from Palo Alto, California
Burials at West Point Cemetery
United States Army generals of World War II
United States Army Infantry Branch personnel
United States Army generals